The 2019 Maldon District Council election took place on 2 May to elect all members of Maldon District Council in Essex, England, the same day as the other 2019 United Kingdom local elections.

Summary

Election result

|-

No Green (-6.5), BNP (-1.5) or Liberal Democrat (-0.8) candidates stood in this election.

Ward results

Althorne

Burnham-on-Crouch North

Burnham-on-Crouch South

Great Totham

Heybridge East

Heybridge West

Maldon East

Maldon North

Maldon South

Maldon West

Mayland

Purleigh

Southminster

Tillingham

Tollesbury

Tolleshunt D'Arcy

Wickham Bishops and Woodham

By-elections

Heybridge East

Tollesbury

Wickham Bishops & Woodham

Heybridge West

References 

2019 English local elections
2019
May 2019 events in the United Kingdom
2010s in Essex